Choi Hyeon-jeong (born 21 July 1981) is a South Korean handball player. She competed in the women's tournament at the 2000 Summer Olympics.

References

1981 births
Living people
South Korean female handball players
Olympic handball players of South Korea
Handball players at the 2000 Summer Olympics
Place of birth missing (living people)